FC Lisse is a Dutch football club from Lisse which was founded in 1981. It currently plays in the Tweede Divisie.

History
The history of FC Lisse is linked to its Catholic religion, the first version of a football club being formed in 1911 by a local Catholic priest, called Lissese Voetbal Vereniging, which was later renamed Lisse Racing Club. In 1921 a separate team, RKVV Lisse, was formed. In 1942 Lisse RC was dissolved, and after World War Two another club, Lisser Boys, was formed. In 1968 an unsuccessful attempt was made to merge RKVV Lisse (later called Sportclub Lisse) and Lisser Boys, but on 17 March 1981 the teams were merged under the name FC Lisse.

The club was automatically promoted to Topklasse in 2009–10, which was introduced as highest amateur level in the Netherlands. After reintroduction of the Tweede Divisie in 2016–17 above the Topklasse, FC Lisse didn’t qualify for the new top amateur championship. A year later, they promoted to the Tweede Divisie, but relegated after just one season. In 2022, FC Lisse entered the Tweede Divisie again by winning the Derde Divisie (new name of the Topklasse).

Current squad

Results

 1989–90: 10th place
 1990–91: 9th place
 1991–92: 6th place
 1992–93: 4th place
 1993–94: 2nd place
 1994–95: 2nd place
 1995–96: 2nd place
 1996–97: Champions
 1997–98: 3rd place
 1998–99: 5th place
 1999-00: 12th place
 2000–01: Champions, Dutch Saturdays Champions Amateur Clubs
 2001–02: 11th place
 2002–03: 9th place
 2003–04: 2nd place
 2004–05: 5th place
 2005–06: 2nd place
 2006–07: 2nd place
 2007–08: Champions, Dutch Champion Amateur Clubs
 2008–09: 8th place
 2009–10: 4th place, promoted to Topklasse 
 2010–11: 11th place
 2011–12: 11th place
 2012–13: 6th place
 2013–14: 8th place
 2014–15: 11th place
 2015–16: 15th place
 2016–17: 2nd place, promoted to Tweede Divisie
 2017–18: 15th place, relegated to Derde Divisie
 2018–19: 10th place
 2019–20: Competition cancelled due to COVID-pandemic
 2020–21: Competition cancelled due to COVID-pandemic
 2021–22: 1st place, promoted to Tweede Divisie
 2022–23:

Notes

External links
  Official website

Football clubs in the Netherlands
Association football clubs established in 1981
Football clubs in South Holland
1981 establishments in the Netherlands
Sport in Lisse